was a renowned Japanese photographer.

References

Japanese photographers
1912 births
1995 deaths